Milan Stavrić (born 21 May 1987) is a Serbian footballer who played as a forward. He last played for OFK Bačka.

References

External links
 
 

1987 births
Living people
People from Pirot
Serbian footballers
Serbian expatriate footballers
Expatriate footballers in Belgium
Serbian expatriate sportspeople in Belgium
Challenger Pro League players
S.K. Beveren players
Royal Antwerp F.C. players
K.R.C. Mechelen players
Expatriate footballers in Bulgaria
Serbian expatriate sportspeople in Bulgaria
First Professional Football League (Bulgaria) players
PFC Slavia Sofia players
Expatriate footballers in Romania
Serbian expatriate sportspeople in Romania
ACS Poli Timișoara players
Liga II players
FK Berane players
Montenegrin First League players
Expatriate footballers in Montenegro
Serbian expatriate sportspeople in Montenegro
FK Radnički Pirot players
FK Balkanski players
FK Radnički Niš players
FK Radnik Surdulica players
FK Dinamo Vranje players
Association football forwards